A war dance is a dance involving mock combat.

War dance may also refer to:
War Dance, an album by the band Colosseum II
Wardance  (Rondinelli album)
"War Dance", a 1978 disco song by Kebekelektrik
"Wardance", a 1980 song by Killing Joke
War Dance (Dad's Army), an episode of the British TV comedy series
War/Dance, a 2007 documentary
War Dancer, a Defiant Comics comic book series

See also
Dance War, an American television series on ABC
Ghost Dance War, a 19th-century armed conflict between Native Americans and the U.S. government
Ohafia War Dance, a mock dance performed by Ohafia people in Eastern Nigeria
Weasel war dance, a colloquial term for a behavior of excited ferrets and weasels